Lambertus Maria Petrus ("Pierre") Hermans (born 16 May 1953 in Vught, North Brabant) is a former field hockey goalkeeper from The Netherlands, who was a member of the Dutch National Men's Team that finished sixth in the 1984 Summer Olympics in Los Angeles. Hermans earned a total number of 86 caps, in the years 1977–1984. After the Los Angeles Games he retired from international competition.

External links
 
 Dutch Hockey Federation

1953 births
Living people
Dutch male field hockey players
Olympic field hockey players of the Netherlands
Field hockey players at the 1984 Summer Olympics
People from Vught
Amsterdamsche Hockey & Bandy Club players
Male field hockey goalkeepers
20th-century Dutch people